Badamestan (also Romanized as Bādāmestān; also known as Badamistan) is a village in Bonab Rural District, in the Central District of Zanjan County, Zanjan Province, Iran. At the 2006 census, its population was 97, in 21 families. This village is actually part of the villages of Tarom region.

References 

Populated places in Zanjan County